The Daily Aztec is a not-for-profit, independent student newspaper serving San Diego State University (SDSU) and the surrounding College Area in San Diego, California.

The Daily Aztec publishes on a regular basis when the university is in session (excluding holidays). It serves a student population of over 35,000 and a faculty and staff population of over 4,000. It is named for the university's mascot, the Aztec.

History 
In the Fall of 1913, the student body of the then-San Diego Normal School voted to begin publishing a four (4) page weekly campus newspaper. The first edition premiered Nov. 26, 1913, as a four-page tabloid, under the name of the Normal News Weekly. In 1921, the paper was renamed the Paper Lantern. In 1960, the paper shifted to daily publication, becoming The Daily Aztec. Over the years the publication's frequency varied; as of Fall 2013, it appears twice a week. In 2017, the organization received a first place award for best college newspaper, from the San Diego Society of Professional Journalists. Several staff members also received individual awards.

Structure 
Although previously connected with the SDSU journalism department, The Daily Aztec is now a program of Associated Students of San Diego State University. The paper is student-run and independent, but overseen by the Student Media Advisory Committee (SMAC). SMAC is composed of students, faculty and staff from SDSU and has both permanent and annual members; SMAC hires the editor in chief, approves the paper's budgets, and is responsible for ensuring that paper follows approved advertising and editorial policies.

Editors in chief 
Catlan Nguyen - 2021-2022 Academic Year 
Brenden Tuccinardi – 2020-2021 Academic Year
Bella Ross – 2019-2020 Academic Year
Will Fritz – 2018-2019 Academic Year
Andrew Dyer – 2017–2018 Academic Year
Jacob Sisneros – 2016–2017 Academic Year
Kelly Hillock – 2015–2016 Academic Year
Monica Linzmeier – 2014–2015 Academic Year
Leonardo Castaneda – 2013–2014 Academic Year
Antonio Zaragoza – 2012–2013 Academic Year
Allie Daugherty – 2011–2012 Academic Year 
Ruthie Kelly – 2010–2011 Academic Year
Faryar Borhani – 2009–2010 Academic Year
Amanda Strouse – 2008–2009 Academic Year
Giselle Domdom – 2007–2008 Academic Year
Ben Tambaschi – 2006–2007 Academic Year
Raven Tyson – 2005–2006 Academic Year
Joe Zarro – 2004–2005 Academic Year
Jessica Zisko – 2002–2003 Academic Year
Matthew A. Dathe – 1988–1989 Academic Year
R. Andrew "Andy" Rathbone – 1986–1987 Academic Year, Author "Windows for Dummies"

A former editor in chief, Dave Hasemeyer (1978–79), went on to win a Pulitzer Prize in 2013 while working for Inside Climate News.

References

External links 
The Daily Aztec homepage
The SDSU News & Media webpage
SDSUniverse news service

San Diego State University
Newspapers published in San Diego
Student newspapers published in California
Newspapers established in 1913